Mohd Zaiza Zainal Abidin (born 1 February 1986) is a Malaysian footballer defender who is currently playing defender for Selangor United.

He is a son of former footballer Zainal Abidin Hassan.

Honours

Club
 Malaysia Cup: 1
 Winners (1): 2013

References

External links
 Profile at selangorfc.com 
 
 Impak Zaiza

Living people
Selangor FA players
Sri Pahang FC players
Malaysian footballers
Sportspeople from Kuala Lumpur
1986 births
People from Kuala Lumpur
Malaysian people of Kenyan descent
Malaysian people of Malay descent
Association football defenders